Eritrean Sign Language (EriSL) is a sign language widely used in Eritrea. It developed out of the Swedish and Finnish Sign Languages, that were introduced by Swedish and Finnish Christian missionaries in 1955, containing a certain amount of local Eritrean signs and having ASL-based Sudanese influences. According to Moges 2011, 70% of the EriSL and Finnish signs are identical. Since 2005, the Eritrean National Association of the Deaf has made linguistic purification attempts to replace Swedish and Finnish signs from the EriSL lexicon by 'Eritrean' ones in an effort to create a more distinct, "indigenous" language. This process is referred to as 'demissionization'.

References

External links 
  Dichotomy of the Deaf Community in Eritrea

Swedish Sign Language family
Languages of Eritrea